Fairfield County Airport may refer to:

Fairfield County Airport (Ohio) in Lancaster, Ohio, United States (FAA: LHQ)
Fairfield County Airport (South Carolina) in Winnsboro, South Carolina, United States (FAA: FDW)

See also
 Fairfield Airport (disambiguation)
 Fairfield Municipal Airport (disambiguation)